Jimmy Johnstone: Lord of the Wing is a 2004 documentary narrated by Scottish comedian Billy Connolly, on the career of Jimmy 'Jinky' Johnstone, a Celtic FC and Scottish footballer in the 1960s and 1970s who was voted the club's greatest ever player. The 'Lord of the Wing' is so well loved by Celtic fans that two memorial bronze statue tributes have been erected in his honour (outside Celtic's Parkhead stadium and in his hometown of Viewpark).

The biographical film includes footage from many of Johnstone's footballing highlights, as well as many tributes from the worlds of football and entertainment. The film culminates with Jimmy joining Jim Kerr and Charlie Burchill (from Simple Minds) to record a cover of the Ewan MacColl classic, "Dirty Old Town", which was later released as a charity single, to raise money for the Motor Neurone Disease Association.

References

External links 
 

Celtic F.C.
British television documentaries
2004 films
2004 documentary films
Documentary films about association football
Documentary films about sportspeople
British sports documentary films
2000s British films